Lemtrans is a private operator of railway rolling stock in Ukraine.

The company claims owning over 20,000 gondola cars which transport over 52 million tons of cargo annually.

Lemtrans is a member of the International Federation of Freight Forwarders Associations and the European Business Association.

In 2017 the company signed agreement with its SCM sister company Metinvest. In 2017 head of Lemtrans Volodymyr Mezentsev in interview explained that due to the War in Donbass, the company has control of 18,000 low-sided cars with the other ones being blocked at the "ATO area". Despite the war conditions in the eastern areas of Ukraine, according to its reports Lemtrans had increased its cargo transportation in 2015 by over 13%.

References

External links
 www.lemtrans.com.ua – Official website
 Profile at the European Business Association
 Profile at the ASSOCIATION OF INTERNATIONAL FREIGHT FORWARDERS OF UKRAINE (FIATA member)

1999 establishments in Ukraine
Railway companies established in 1999
Railway companies of Ukraine
Ukrainian brands